Eva Birgitta Björklund (born November 12, 1942 in Lycksele, Västerbotten County) is a Swedish Left Party politician. She is currently a substitute to the board of the Left Party, and editor of the periodical Kuba ("Cuba") which is published by the Swedish-Cuban Association. She is a former chairman of the Swedish-Cuban Association. She has also translated many texts by Che Guevara into Swedish.

References

1942 births
Living people
People from Lycksele Municipality
Left Party (Sweden) politicians
Swedish communists
21st-century Swedish women politicians